Wouri may refer to several places:

 Wouri (department), a division of the Littoral Province in Cameroon
 Wouri River, a river in Cameroon
 Wouri Bridge, a major port of Cameroon
 Wouri estuary, a large tidal estuary in Cameroon